Aleksandr Olerski (18 May 1973 – 21 October 2011) was a football forward from Estonia. His last club was FC Puuma Tallinn.

Olerski died on 21 October 2011, at the age of 38, because of heart failure.

International career
He obtained a total number of two caps for the Estonia national football team during his career. He earned his first official cap on 21 February 1993, when Estonia met Latvia in an indoor friendly.

References

External links

1973 births
2011 deaths
Estonian footballers
Estonia international footballers
Association football forwards
FC Puuma Tallinn players